Tylopilus indecisus is a bolete fungus in the family Boletaceae native to North America. It was described in 1888 by Charles Horton Peck.

See also
List of North American boletes

References

indecisus
Fungi described in 1888
Fungi of the United States
Taxa named by Charles Horton Peck
Fungi without expected TNC conservation status